Tenement Symphony (subtitled Kies und Glanz • Grit and Glitter • Grès et Paillettes) is the seventh studio album by English singer-songwriter Marc Almond. It was released in October 1991 and reached number 39 on the UK Albums Chart. Tenement Symphony includes three UK top 40 hit singles; "Jacky", "My Hand Over My Heart" and "The Days of Pearly Spencer" (which would become Almond's last UK top 10 hit to date).

Background
Working with former La Magia and Willing Sinners member Billy McGee, and his former Soft Cell bandmate David Ball as well as various studio musicians, Almond recorded the album at Maison Rouge, Sarm West Studios, Fishermans Room, Berlin, CTS Studios, Berwick St Studios, RAK and Pacific Studios.

Composition
The album is divided into two sections; 'Grit' and 'Glitter'. The first five songs constituted the 'Grit' and were produced by Almond, Billy McGee, Nigel Hine, and The Grid. The 'Glitter' side (the Tenement Symphony) was produced by Trevor Horn. The artwork was designed by Green Ink with a cover photograph by Klanger and Boink. The album cover mimics the style of German record label Deutsche Grammophon's classical records.

Almond wrote in his autobiography that the album's concept was largely down to Rob Dickins and that he did not feel the album truly reflected his artistic direction at that time, though he was pleased to have had the opportunity to work with Trevor Horn.

Track listing

Personnel

Marc Almond – vocals, keyboards, arranger
David Ball - synthesizer, programming
Anne Dudley – keyboards, arranger, orchestration
J.J. Belle – guitar
Sally Bradshaw – vocals
Betsy Cook – vocals
Mitch Dalton – guitar
Andy Duncan – drums, percussion, percussion programming
Trevor Horn – bass on "What Is Love?", organ
Billy McGee –  keyboards, arranger
Julian Mendelsohn – mixing
Richard Norris – percussion programming
Nick Plytas – piano on "I've Never Seen Your Face"
Lynda Richardson – choir master
Richard Riley – guitar
Philip Todd – soprano and tenor saxophone
Tim Weidner – bass
Bruce Woolley – keyboards, vocals
Gavyn Wright – string conductor
Nigel Hine – programming
Julian Stringle – clarinet
Steve Rapport – artwork
Inga Humpe – programming, vocals
Eric Caudieux – guitar, keyboards, programming
Max Loderbauer – programming

Charts

See also
  – musical with song "Tenement Symphony" sung by Tony Martin

References

1991 albums
Albums produced by Trevor Horn
Marc Almond albums